Abdulaziz Haqqani (born ), also known as Aziz Haqqani, is an Afghan senior member of the Haqqani network, one of the sons of its former leader Jalaluddin Haqqani, and deputy to his brother Sirajuddin Haqqani. While his brother operates as the overall leader of the network, Abdulaziz functions as his deputy and operational commander in charge of planning and undertaking all major attacks.

Life 
Abdulaziz Haqqani was born in Afghanistan between the years 1987 and 1989 to Jalaluddin Haqqani and his first wife. He is referred to by the Taliban with the honorific 'Hafiz', indicating that he has completely memorized the Qur'an. After the deterioration of Jalaluddin Haqqani's health, his son Sirajuddin Haqqani took over operations as the overall leader of the Haqqani network. Another son of Jalaluddin, Badruddin Haqqani, took up a high-level role in the organization as an operational commander, before being killed in an American drone strike in 2012. Following his brother Badruddin's killing, Abdulaziz Haqqani assumed responsibility for all major Haqqani Network attacks, heavily engaging in military decision-making and logistical processes. Subsequent to the 2021 Taliban Offensive and restoration of the Islamic emirate of Afghanistan's rule over the country, he was officially appointed to the position of deputy to Sirajuddin Haqqani. According to FDD's Long War Journal, as head of Haqqani network operations, Abdulaziz Haqqani maintains strong ties to al-Qaeda, Lashkar-e-Tayyiba, and Tehrik-e-Taliban Pakistan.

Sanctions 
Although the Haqqani network has been sanctioned by the United States as a Foreign Terrorist Organization since September 2012, Abdulaziz Haqqani has only been sanctioned as a Specially Designated Global Terrorist since 25 August 2015, with a reward of up to $5 million USD for information leading to his location. This move was decried by the Taliban, who described Abdulaziz Haqqani as simply a “low-ranking Mujahid of Islamic Emirate" whilst stating that the sanctions would be ineffective.

References 

Afghan warlords
Afghan Islamists
Afghan Muslims
Afghan Sunni Muslims
Haqqani network
Individuals designated as terrorists by the United States government
Living people
Pashtun people
Place of birth missing (living people)
Taliban commanders
Taliban leaders
Year of birth missing (living people)